Dhvaja refers to the Sanskrit word for a banner or a flag. Flags are featured in the iconography, mythology, and architecture of Indian religions such as Buddhism, Hinduism, and Jainism. They are one of the ashtamangala, the eight auspicious emblems of these religions.

Hinduism
In Hindu iconography, deities are often portrayed with flags, often represented carried or present alongside their mounts. Such flags are often venerated due to their association of a given deity, and also due to the fact that they are regarded to be imbued by their divine attributes. A flag staff or a votive column (dhvajastambha) is often erected in front of temples or on top of their roofs. These columns are regarded to symbolise the world axis, and a pillar between earth and heaven.

A chapter from the epic Mahabharata describes the various flags and their devices borne by the warriors of the Kurukshetra War:  

 Abhimanyu - Deer
 Arjuna - Hanuman
 Ashvatthama - Lion's tail with golden rays
 Bharata - Tree
 Bhima - Lion
 Bhishma - Tree
 Drona - Kamandalu
 Duryodhana - Serpent
 Ghatotkacha - Wheel
 Indra - Sword
 Jayadratha - Boar
 Kama - Makara
 Karna - Elephant
 Kartikeya - Peacock
 Kripa - Bull
 Nakula - Deer
 Sahadeva - Swan
 Shiva - Nandi
 Vishnu - Garuda
 Yudhishthira - Moon

Tibetan architecture

Within the Tibetan tradition, a list of eleven different forms of the victory banner is given to represent eleven specific methods for overcoming "defilements" (Sanskrit: klesha). Many variations of the dhvaja's design can be seen on the roofs of Tibetan monasteries (Gompa, Vihara) to symbolize the Buddha's victory over four maras.

In its most traditional form, the victory banner is fashioned as a cylindrical ensign mounted upon a long wooden axel-pole. The top of the banner takes the form of a small white "parasol" (Sanskrit: chhatra), which is surrounded by a central "wish granting gem" (Sanskrit: cintamani). This domed parasol is rimmed by an ornate golden crest-bar or moon-crest with makara-trailed ends, from which hangs a billowing yellow or "white silk scarf'"(Sanskrit: khata) (see top right).

As a hand-held ensign, the victory banner is an attribute of many deities, particularly those associated with wealth and power, such as Vaiśravaṇa, the Great Guardian King of the north. As a roof-mounted ensign, the victory banners are cylinders usually made of beaten copper (similar to toreutics) and are traditionally placed on the four corners of monastery and temple roofs. Those roof ornaments usually take the form of a small circular parasol surmounted by the wish-fulfilling gem, with four or eight makara heads at the parasol edge, supporting little silver bells (see the Jokhang Dhvaja on the left). A smaller victory banner fashioned on a beaten copper frame, hung with black silk, and surmounted by a flaming "trident" (Sanskrit: trishula) is also commonly displayed on roofs (see the dhvaja on the roof of the Potala Palace below).

History 
Dhvajas are probably depicted in Indus Valley Civilization seals, one Indus seal depicts four men carrying variously shaped djvajas or standards and later also on cast copper coins from the early historic period of the Indian Sub continent. Heliodorus pillar inscription also declares the pillar to be Garudadhvaja or Garuda standard.

See also 
 Bhagwa Dhwaj
 Dwajasthambam
 Hindu iconography
 Sitatapatra

References

External links

Buddhist ritual implements
Buddhist symbols
Ritual weapons
Tibetan Buddhist practices
Tibetan Buddhist ritual implements
Hindu architecture
Hindu temple architecture
Hindu symbols
Jain symbols
Hindu iconography